The Day's round herring (Dayella malabarica) is a relative of the herring that is endemic to southwestern India.  It is the only species in its genus. It is named after Francis Day who described the species in 1873.

References

Day's round herring
Fish of India
Endemic fauna of India
Fauna of South India
Day's round herring
Day's round herring